Madonna of the Streets is a 1930 American Pre-Code drama film directed by John S. Robertson and starring Evelyn Brent. The film is a sound remake of the 1924 silent film Madonna of the Streets starring Alla Nazimova. A copy of the film is preserved in the Library of Congress collection.

Cast
 Evelyn Brent as May
 Robert Ames as Morton
 Ivan Linow as Slumguillion
 Josephine Dunn as Marion
 Edwards Davis as Clark
 Zack Williams as Blink
 Richard Tucker as Kingsley
 Ed Brady as Ramsey

References

External links

Madonna of the Streets at TCM.com

1930 films
1930 drama films
American drama films
American black-and-white films
Remakes of American films
Sound film remakes of silent films
Films directed by John S. Robertson
Columbia Pictures films
Films with screenplays by Jo Swerling
1930s English-language films
1930s American films